Vagla may be,

Vagla language, Ghana
VaGla (Piotr Waglowski, Polish lawyer)